Jason Lowe (born 30 October 1972) is an English professional darts player who competes in Professional Darts Corporation (PDC) events.

Career
A builder by trade, Lowe entered Q-School in 2017 and 2018, but didn't win a Tour Card on either occasion. However, he competed in the UK Open Qualifiers, and qualified for the 2018 UK Open, by reaching the semi-final of 2018 UK Open Qualifier 4. He reached the last 32 of the event, before losing to Chris Dobey.

He entered the Challenge Tour, and reached the final of Challenge Tour 6, where he lost to Michael Barnard. He also reached his first PDC European Tour event by qualifying for the 2018 European Darts Matchplay.

Lowe won a PDC Tour Card for the first time on 16 January 2020 by beating Steve Brown at Q-School. He played on the PDC ProTour in 2020 and 2021.

World Championship results

PDC
 2021: Third round (lost to Devon Petersen 0–4)
 2022: Second round (lost to José de Sousa 2–3)

Performance timeline

PDC European Tour

(W) Won; (F) finalist; (SF) semifinalist; (QF) quarterfinalist; (#R) rounds 6, 5, 4, 3, 2, 1; (RR) round-robin stage; (Prel.) Preliminary round; (DNQ) Did not qualify; (DNP) Did not participate; (NH) Not held; (EX) Excluded; (WD) Withdrew

References

External links

1972 births
Living people
Professional Darts Corporation former tour card holders
English darts players
People from Cradley Heath
21st-century English people